Yellowstone River oil spill may refer to:

 2011 Yellowstone River oil spill
 2015 Yellowstone River oil spill